Tyler Technologies, Inc., based in Plano, Texas, is a provider of software to the United States public sector. Tyler Technologies has offices in 17 states and one in Toronto, Ontario, Canada.

History
Tyler Technologies was founded by Joseph F. McKinney in 1966 as Saturn Industries after buying three government companies from Ling-Temco-Vought. In 1968, the company acquired Tyler Pipe, a manufacturer of iron pipes, which eventually became the company's main source of annual revenue. Tyler Pipe was later renamed Tyler Corporation as a result of its success. In 1969, Saturn Industries was listed on the New York Stock Exchange. In 1970, the company changed its name to Tyler Corporation. Tyler Corporation entered the government software market in 1998. Tyler Corporation changed its name to Tyler Technologies in 1999.

Acquisitions
Since 1998, the company has acquired:
 Business Resources Corporation (BRC) in Minneapolis, MN and Interactive Computer Designs, Inc. (Incode) in Lubbock, TX, and The Software Group, Inc. in Plano, TX were acquired in 1998.
 Eagle Computer Systems, Inc. in Eagle, CO, Micro Arizala Systems, Inc. (Fundbalance) in Ann Arbor, MI, Process Incorporated d/b/a Computer Center Software (Munis) in Falmouth, ME, Gemini Systems (a subsidiary of Essex Technology Group, Inc. in Rochelle Park, NJ), and Cole Layer Trumble Company (CLT) in Dayton, OH, were acquired in 1999.

 Eden Systems, Inc. in Renton, WA and GBF Information Systems in Portland, ME, were acquired in 2003.
 MazikUSA, Inc. (Mazik Global, Inc.), in Park Ridge, IL and TACS, Inc. in Indianapolis, IN, were acquired in 2006.
 Advanced Data Systems, Inc. in Bangor, ME, EDP Enterprises, Inc. in Longview, TX, and Chandler Information Systems in Cameron, TX, were acquired in 2007.
Versatrans in Latham, NY, Olympia Computing Company, Inc. in Olympia, WA, and School Information Systems in St. Louis, MO, Inc., were acquired in 2008.
 PulseMark, LLC in St. Louis, MO, Assessment Evaluation Services, Inc. in San Diego, CA, and Parker-Lowe & Associates in Ocracoke, NC, were acquired in 2009 
 Wiznet, Inc. in Delray Beach, FL, acquired in 2010
 Yotta MVS Inc. in Kansas City, MO and Windsor Management Group (Infinite Visions) in Tempe, AZ for $23.5 million, were acquired in 2011.
 Akanda Innovation, Inc. in Toronto, Ontario, Canada, UniFund, LLC in Nashua, NH, Computer Software Associates, Inc. in Billings, MT, and EnerGov Solutions in Duluth, GA, were acquired in 2012
SoftCode, Inc. in Marlborough, MA, acquired in 2014
Brazos Technology Corporation in College Station, TX and New World Systems in Troy, MI, were acquired in 2015.
 ExecuTime Software, LLC in Tulsa, OK, acquired in 2016.
 Modria Inc. in San Jose, CA, Digital Health Department, Inc. in Charlotte, NC, and Radio 10-33 in Plymouth, MN were acquired in 2017.
Socrata in Seattle, WA, Sage Data Security, LLC in Portland, ME, CaseloadPro in Modesto, California, MobileEyes of Troy, Michigan and Atlanta, and SceneDoc in Mississauga, ON, were acquired in 2018.
MicroPact in Herndon, Virginia, and MyCivic in Seal Beach, California for $3.9 million, were acquired in 2019
 NIC Inc. was acquired in April 2021.

Products
The company's public sector software includes eight categories: appraisal and tax software and services, integrated software for courts and justice agencies, data and insights services, enterprise financial software systems, planning/regulatory/maintenance software, public safety software, records/document management software, and transportation software for schools.

References

External links

Companies based in Plano, Texas
Software companies based in Texas
Public sector in the United States
Companies listed on the New York Stock Exchange
Software companies of the United States
American companies established in 1966
Software companies established in 1966
1966 establishments in Texas
1960s initial public offerings